Stanislaus Josef Mathias von Prowazek, Edler von Lanow (12 November 1875 Jindřichův Hradec, Bohemia – 17 February 1915, Cottbus), born Stanislav Provázek, was a Czech zoologist and parasitologist, who along with pathologist Henrique da Rocha Lima (1879-1956) discovered the pathogen of epidemic typhus.

As a student at the University of Prague, he was influenced by the teachings of zoologist Berthold Hatschek and philosopher Ernst Mach. Other important influences to his career were immunologist Paul Ehrlich at the Institute for Experimental Therapy in Frankfurt (1901) and zoologist Richard von Hertwig at the University of Munich.

With radiologist Ludwig Halberstädter, he described the inclusion bodies (Halberstädter-Prowazek bodies) of Chlamydia trachomatis, the agent that is the cause of trachoma.

In 1906 he succeeded his late friend, Fritz Schaudinn, as director of the zoological section at the Institut für Schiffs- und Tropenkrankheiten in Hamburg. In 1908 he conducted research at the Instituto Oswaldo Cruz, outside of Rio de Janeiro, and from 1910, carried out investigations of infectious diseases in Sumatra, German Samoa, Yap and Saipan.

Prowazek studied epidemic typhus in Serbia (1913) and Istanbul (1914). Later, while Prowazek and Rocha Lima were working in a German prison hospital, they both became infected with typhus. Prowazek died soon afterwards on February 17, 1915. Rocha Lima named the infectious agent of epidemic typhus - Rickettsia prowazekii - after his colleague.

Written Works 
 Die pathogenen Protozoen (mit Ausnahme der Hämosporidien) (with Franz Theodor Doflein) – in Kolle and Wassermann's Handbuch der pathogenen Microorganismen. Jena, 1903, volume I: 865–1006.
 Über Zelleinschlüsse parasitärer Natur beim Trachom. Arbeiten aus dem Kaiserlichen Gesundheitsamte, Berlin, 1907, 26: 44–47. with Ludwig Halberstädter. 
 Zur Aetiologie des Trachoms. Deutsche medizinische Wochenschrift, August 1907, 33: 1285.1287. with Ludwig Halberstädter.
 Einführung in die Physiologie der Einzelligen (1910).
 Zur Kenntnis der Giemsafärbung vom Standpunkt der Zytologie. - 1914. Digital edition by the University and State Library Düsseldorf (in German).
 Handbuch der pathogenen Protozoen (1912).

References 
 Who Named It? (biography of Henrique da Rocha Lima)

1875 births
1915 deaths
Czech zoologists
Czech parasitologists
Science writers
Bohemian nobility
Expatriates from the Austro-Hungarian Empire in the Ottoman Empire
Austrian expatriates in Turkey
People from Jindřichův Hradec
Edlers of Austria
Zoologists from the Austro-Hungarian Empire